Lochhead is a surname shared by several notable people, among them being:

 Alex Lochhead (born 1866), Scottish footballer
 Andy Lochhead (born 1941), Scottish footballer
 Archie Lochhead (1892–1971), Scottish-American banker
 Arthur Lochhead (1897–1966), Scottish footballer
 David Lochhead (1936–1999), Canadian theologian
 Duggie Lochhead (1904–1968), Scottish football manager
 Kenneth Lochhead (1926–2006), Canadian painter
 Liz Lochhead (born 1947), Scottish poet and playwright
 Matty Lochhead (1884–1964), Scottish footballer
 Richard Lochhead (born 1969), Scottish politician
 Tony Lochhead (born 1982), New Zealand former professional soccer player

See also
 Lockheed (disambiguation)
 Lougheed (disambiguation)